Steve Burton may refer to:

Steve Burton (actor) (born 1970), American actor
Steve Burton (footballer, born 1982), English footballer for Östersunds FK, formerly Kidderminster Harriers and Richmond, amongst others
Steve Burton (footballer, born 1983), English footballer for Balcatta SC, formerly Scarborough and Crawley Town, amongst others
Steve Burton (sports journalist), television sports reporter for WBZ-TV and WSBK-TV in Boston
Steve Burton, character in Babies for Sale